All Pigs Must Die is an album by Death in June, released in 2001. The first half of the album bears the typical later Death in June neofolk sound, whereas the second half of the album has a much more chaotic, experimental sound to it.

The album was originally released as a limited edition LP on coloured vinyl; most copies of the 2000 released were pressed on a colour dubbed "piggy pink", but a portion of these were pressed on pink vinyl with red spatters, in a variant dubbed "bloody piggy". The album was also released on CD, and has since been made available on cassette and picture disc.

Track listing
 "All Pigs Must Die"
 "Tick Tock"
 "Disappear in Every Way" 
 "The Enemy Within" 
 "We Said Destroy II"
 "Flies Have Their House"
 "With Bad Blood"
 "No Pig Day (Some Night We're Going to Party Like it's 1969)"
 "We Said Destroy III"
 "Lords of the Sties"
 "Ride Out!"

Personnel 

 Accordion, flute: Andreas Ritter (tracks 1 to 6)
 Musician: Douglas P.
 Trumpet: Campbell Finley (tracks 1, 3, 5, and 6)
 Vocals (spoken word): Boyd Rice (tracks 2 and 5)

References

Death in June albums
2001 albums